Mera Haq is a 2017 Pakistani drama serial directed by Fahad Rehmani, produced by Erum Binte Shahid and written by Muhammad Asif. The drama stars Madiha Iftikhar, Arooba Mirza and Bilal Qureshi in lead roles,  and was first aired on 25 December 2017 on Geo Entertainment. The story revolves around a sister's rivalry and greed
. It was a come-back serial of Madiha Iftikhar after the serial Ishq Ki Inteha.

Cast

Main Lead
Madiha Iftikhar As Sara
Bilal Qureshi As Ali
Arooba Mirza As Saba
Shamil Khan As Umair
Zhalay Sarhadi

Supporting Characters
Shaista Jabeen As Salma
Anwar Iqbal As Zaheer
Zaheen Tahira As Sajeela (Dadi)
Fauzia Mushtaq As Maryam
Marium Shafi As Samina
Zahida Batool 
Rafia Nasir
Rose Muhammad
Maira Baloch
Raja Feroz
Syed Nabeel
Babar Khan (Child Star)

Special Appearance
Fareeha Jabeen
Qurat ul Ain
Fahad Rehmani

Production
The drama is produced by Erum Binte Shahid from Production house Dramaybaaz Productions which produce hit serial Silsilay. It is the first drama serial produced by Dramaybaaz Productions.

Released
The serial was first aired on 25 December 2017,on timing slot Monday and Tuesday at 7:00 P.M with one hour episode on Geo Entertainment. It was interrupted for one month due to the month of Ramadan. After Ramadan its timing decreased to half an hour from Monday to Friday at 7:30 P.M to 8:00 P.M.

References

External links 
 Official Website

Pakistani drama television series
Urdu-language television shows
2017 Pakistani television series debuts